King the Land is an upcoming South Korean television series starring Lee Jun-ho and Im Yoon-ah. It is scheduled to premiere on JTBC in the first half of 2023. It will also be available for streaming on Netflix and TVING in selected regions.

Synopsis
King the Land tells the story of Goo Won (Lee Jun-ho) who is the heir of The King Group, a luxury hotel conglomerate, who was thrown into an inheritance war, and Cheon Sa-rang (Im Yoon-ah), a hotelier who always has an smile on her face till she meets Goo Won.

Cast

Main
 Lee Jun-ho as Goo Won
 Im Yoon-ah as Cheon Sa-rang

Supporting
 Ahn Se-ha as Noh Sang-sik
 Kim Jae-won as Lee Roon
 Go Won-hee as Oh Pyung-hwa
 Kim Ga-eun as Kang Da-eul

References

External links
 
 
 

JTBC television dramas
Korean-language television shows
Television series by JTBC Studios
South Korean romantic comedy television series
2023 South Korean television series debuts

Upcoming television series